Dae Imlani (born 12 May 1954) is a Filipino former swimmer. He competed in four events at the 1972 Summer Olympics. He won silver medals in the 4 x 100 metre freestyle relay and the 4 x 200 metre freestyle relay at the 1970 Asian Games.

References

External links
 

1954 births
Living people
Filipino male freestyle swimmers
Olympic swimmers of the Philippines
Swimmers at the 1972 Summer Olympics
Asian Games silver medalists for the Philippines
Asian Games bronze medalists for the Philippines
Asian Games medalists in swimming
Swimmers at the 1970 Asian Games
Swimmers at the 1974 Asian Games
Medalists at the 1970 Asian Games
Medalists at the 1974 Asian Games
Place of birth missing (living people)